Izaquel Gomes Té (born 1 September 2001), known as Zicky Té, is a Bissau-Guinean-born Portuguese futsal player who plays as a pivot for Sporting CP and the Portugal national team.

Honours

Sporting
 Liga Portuguesa: 2020–21, 2021–22
 Taça de Portugal: 2019–20, 2021–22
 Taça da Liga de Futsal: 2020–21, 2021–22
 Supertaça de Futsal: 2021
 UEFA Futsal Champions League: 2020–21

Portugal
 FIFA Futsal World Cup: 2021
 UEFA Futsal Championship: 2022
 Futsal Finalissima: 2022

References

External links

Zicky Té at playmakerstats.com (formerly thefinalball.com)

2001 births
Living people
Futsal forwards
Portuguese sportspeople of Bissau-Guinean descent
Bissau-Guinean emigrants to Portugal
Black Portuguese sportspeople
Sportspeople from Bissau
Naturalised citizens of Portugal
Portuguese men's futsal players
Bissau-Guinean men's futsal players
Sporting CP futsal players